Don J. Gruber (born July 27, 1930) was a politician in the American state of Florida. He served in the Florida Senate from 1972 to 1974, representing the 40th district.

References

1930 births
Living people
Members of the Florida House of Representatives